The Black Album/Come On Feel The Dandy Warhols is a 2004 double album released by American alternative band, The Dandy Warhols. The two-disc set was released on their own Beat the World Records label. Initially, the album was only available to purchase through the band's website. It is now available to own via other sources.

Overview
Disc one marks the first, official release of the band's 1996 demo album (The Black Album) which was described as "lost". The album, recorded before ...The Dandy Warhols Come Down, was rejected by Capitol Records and dismissed by the band themselves. Three songs that were included on the original recording of the album are not included on this release, namely: "Traci Lords", "Alien" and "You Get High".

The second disc (Come On Feel The Dandy Warhols) is the first compilation album released by the band. It contains B-sides, covers, and previously unreleased material.  Glide Magazine stated that the cover of Crosby, Stills, Nash and Young's "Ohio" used "droning synthesizers" to produce an "alt/psychedelia sound."

Track listing

Track info
(Sources:)
The song "Boys" was later released as "Boys Better".
Early versions of the song "Earth to the Dandy Warhols" had been known as "E Jams" and/or "Part 1".
The song "Not If You Were the Last Junkie in Tony's Basement" is a Tony Lash remix of the song "Not If You Were the Last Junkie on Earth", and was formally released as "Not If You Were the Last Junkie on Earth (Tony's Basement Mix)".
The song "Thanks for the Show" was formally released as "Kinky".
Neil Young's first name is misspelled as "Niel" in the liner notes.
The song "One Saved Message" was formally released as "Phone Call".
The song "One Ultra Lame White Boy" was formally released as "One (Ultra Lame White Boy)".

Personnel
The Dandy Warhols
Disc one:
Courtney Taylor-Taylor – vocals, guitars, keyboards
Zia McCabe – keyboards, bass
Peter Holmström – guitars
Eric Hedford – drums
Disc two:
Courtney Taylor-Taylor – vocals, guitar, keyboards, percussion
Peter Holmström – guitars, vocals
Zia McCabe – keyboards, bass, vocals
Brent DeBoer – drums, guitars, vocals
Eric Hedford – drums, vocal harmonies (1, 7, 15–18)
Album design and layout by Sean Gothman and Courtney Taylor-Taylor

References

External links

The Dandy Warhols: The Black Album at The Dandy Warhols' official website

The Dandy Warhols albums
2004 albums
Self-released albums